Thomas Paul Cranston (born 21 November 1983) is an English former cricketer.

Cranston was born at Aylesbury in November 1983. He made his debut for Hertfordshire in a List A one-day match against Staffordshire at Welwyn Garden City in the 1st round of the 2002 Cheltenham & Gloucester Trophy (played in August 2001). Batting at number three, he was dismissed by Richard Cooper for 18 runs. The following year he made his debut in minor counties cricket for Hertfordshire, making three appearances in the Minor Counties Championship and two appearances in the MCCA Knockout Trophy.

References

External links

1983 births
Living people
Sportspeople from Aylesbury
English cricketers
Hertfordshire cricketers